Hamacreadium is a genus of trematodes in the family Opecoelidae. It is synonymous with Olivacreadium Bilqees, 1976. Species of Hamacreadium are endoparasitic in fish such as Lethrinus Cuvier, 1829.

Species
Hamacreadium cribbi Bray & Justine, 2016
Hamacreadium hainanense Shen, 1990
Hamacreadium interruptum Nagaty, 1941
Hamacreadium lethrini Yamaguti, 1934
Hamacreadium longivesiculum (Yamaguti, 1952) Martin, Cutmore, Ward & Cribb, 2017
Hamacreadium lutiani (Shen, 1990) Martin, Cutmore, Ward & Cribb, 2017
Hamacreadium morgani Baz, 1946
Hamacreadium mutabile Linton, 1910
Hamacreadium phyllorchis (Bilqees, 1976) Cribb, 2005

Species synonymised with species of Hamacreadium
Hamacreadium hainanense Shen, 1990
Maculifer spiralis Soota, Srivastava & Ghosh, 1970
Hamacreadium interruptum Nagaty, 1941
Hamacreadium interruptus Nagaty, 1941
Hamacreadium longivesiculum (Yamaguti, 1952)
Plagioporus longivesicula Yamaguti, 1952
Hamacreadium lutiani (Shen, 1990) Martin, Cutmore, Ward & Cribb, 2017
Podocotyle lutiani Shen, 1990
Hamacreadium morgani Baz, 1946
Hamacreadium agyptia Abdou, Heckmann, Beltagy & Ashour, 2001
Hamacreadium balistesi Nagaty & Abdel-Aal, 1962
Hamacreadium egyptia Abdou, Heckmann, Beltagy & Ashour, 2001
Hamacreadium lenthrium Manter, 1963
Hamacreadium lethrini Nagaty & Abdel-Aal, 1962
Hamacreadium nagatyi Lamothe-Argumedo, 1962
Hamacreadium nebulosae Nagaty & Abdel-Aal, 1962
Hamacreadium mutabile Linton, 1910
Hamacreadium indicum Gupta & Tewari, 1985
Hamacreadium phyllorchis (Bilqees, 1976)
Hamacreadium heterorchis (Bilqees, 1976) Cribb, 2005
Olivacreadium heterorchis Biqees, 1976
Olivacreadium phyllorchis Bilqees, 1976

References

Opecoelidae
Plagiorchiida genera